The 1983–84 Iona Gaels men's basketball team represented Iona College during the 1983–84 NCAA Division I men's basketball season. The Gaels, led fourth-year by head coach Pat Kennedy, played their home games at the Hynes Athletic Center and were members of the Metro Atlantic Athletic Conference. The Gaals finished in a three-way tie atop the MAAC regular season standings, and would go on to win the MAAC Basketball tournament to receive an automatic bid to the 1984 NCAA tournament. As the No. 10 seed in the East region, the Gaels lost to No. 7 seed and eventual Final Four participant Virginia in the opening round.

Roster

Schedule and results

|-
!colspan=9 style=| Regular season

|-
!colspan=9 style=| MAAC tournament

|-
!colspan=9 style=| NCAA tournament

Awards and honors
Steve Burtt – MAAC Player of the Year

NBA draft

References

Iona Gaels men's basketball seasons
Iona
Iona